Dancing in the Street is a  live album by jazz group the Ramsey Lewis Trio which was released in 1967 on Cadet Records. The album got to No. 16 on the Billboard Hot R&B LPs chart.

Overview
As an album Dancing in the Street was recorded during July, 1967 at Basin Street West, San Francisco. Dancing in the Street was also produced by Esmond Edwards.

Singles
The album's title track, a cover of   Martha and the Vandellas' Dancing in the Street rose to No. 36 on the Billboard Adult Contemporary Songs chart.

Track listing

Side 1

Side 2

Personnel 
 Cleveland Eaton     - bass 
 Ramsey Lewis	 - piano, keyboards 
 Maurice White	 - drums

Charts

References 

Ramsey Lewis albums
Ramsey Lewis live albums
1967 albums
1967 live albums
Albums produced by Esmond Edwards
Cadet Records albums
Cadet Records live albums